The Polish Infantry Regiment; (Polish: Pulk Piechoty) during World War 2  comprised on average some 2,900 men and 60 officers organised around 3 rifle battalions armed with either the Karabinek wz.29 or the Wz. 98, 7.92mm bolt-action rifles. Each 19-man squad was also issued the RKM wz.28 light machine gun. Other regimental weapons included the Polish version of the French Model 1897 75-mm field gun, the Wz. 35 anti-tank rifle, the Ckm wz.30 heavy machine gun, the wz.31 81 mm mortar, and the wz.36 46mm light mortar/grenade launcher.

Table of Organization and Equipment
 1 Recon Company
4 light machine guns
2 antitank rifles
 1 Antitank Company
9 37 mm antitank guns
 1 Pioneer Platoon
 1 Artillery Platoon
2 75 mm Mle 1897 field guns
 1 Antigas Platoon
 1 Communications Platoon
 3 Rifle Battalions
 3 Rifle Companies
9 light machine guns
3 46 mm mortars
3 antitank rifles
 1 heavy machine gun company
12 heavy machine guns
2 81 mm mortars

References 

Infantry regiments of Poland
Military units and formations of Poland in World War II
Military history of Poland during World War II
Tables of Organisation and Equipment